CGS Shadhin Bangla is a Sobuj Bangla-class inshore patrol vessel of the Bangladesh Coast Guard. She is serving the Bangladesh Coast Guard since 2020.

Design
Her complement is 45 persons and can carry out missions lasting up to seven days at a time.

Armament
The ship is armed with two Oerlikon KBA 25 mm guns, one forward and one backward. She also carries two 14.5 mm Heavy machine guns.

See also
List of ships of the Bangladesh Coast Guard

References

Ships of the Bangladesh Coast Guard
Sobuj Bangla-class patrol vessels
2019 ships
Ships built at Khulna Shipyard